Gaziantep Futbol Kulübü is a Turkish professional football club based in Gaziantep. Founded in 1988, the club played in the Süper Lig, the highest tier of Turkish football, until their withdrawal from the league on 11 February 2023.

The club was founded as Sankospor in 1988 and competed at the amateur level until 1993. They competed between the TFF Third League and TFF First League until 2019, when they were promoted to Süper Lig. During the 2020–21 season, the club reached the top of the standings in week 17, which they held for one week until being taken over by Beşiktaş J.K.

History
The club was founded at the amateur level as Sankospor under Sanko Holding A.Ş., an industrial group of companies headquartered in Gaziantep, in 1988. The first colors of club were blue and white. The club started to compete at TFF Third League in the 1993–94 season. In the TFF Third League, they played their first game in professional leagues against İslahiyespor, another Gaziantep-based club, which ended as a goalless draw on 26 September 1993.  Amassing 85 points with 27 wins in a total of 34 games, the team won Group 3 of the 1996–97 season and was promoted to the TFF Second League, with 17 points above the closest competitor Kilis Belediyespor.

The name of the club was changed to Gaziantep Büyükşehir Belediyespor in the beginning of the 1999–2000 season. The club won the Group C title of the 2004–05 season of the TFF Second League, winning 22 games out of 34 with 73 points, scoring 90 goals.

The club made the playoffs for the first time in the 2010–11 season of the TFF First League, when they were defeated by Orduspor 1–0. In the same season, Gaziantep reached the quarter finals of the 2010–11 Turkish Cup, beaten by Beşiktaş J.K. 0–8 (0–5 and 0–3) in aggregate score.

The name of club was changed for third time as Gazişehir Gaziantep Futbol Kulübü, following the general assembly held on 15 June 2017. The club competed at TFF First League for 2 seasons under this name. The club reached play-offs in 2 consecutive seasons between 2017–18 season under Erkan Sözeri, and 2018–19 season under Mehmet Altıparmak's management. In 2017–18 season, club was eliminated by Erzurum BB after 4–5 final score in play-off final after penalty shoot-outs.

In 2018–19 season, this time club defeated Hatayspor by 5–3 final score after penalty shoot-outs and promoted to Süper Lig. Thus, after Gaziantepspor, Gazişehir Gaziantep are the 2nd team in history to compete at Süper Lig from city of Gaziantep.

Following their promotion to Süper Lig, the club announced the employment of Marius Șumudică as head coach on a single-season-basis contract with a potential one season extension, on 13 June 2019. In match week 1 of 2019–20 season, the club made their Süper Lig debut against Fenerbahçe S.K. on an away game held at Şükrü Saracoğlu Stadium, which Gaziantep FK lost by 0–5 final score, on 19 August 2019. Following week of fixtures, they achieved their first Süper Lig win agasint Gençlerbirliği with a 4–1 final score, on 26 August 2019. The first Süper Lig level goal of the club was scored by Olarenwaju Kayode. In October 2019, name of the club was changed once again as Gaziantep Futbol Kulübü. On 28 October 2019, the club announced the contract renewal with coach Șumudică, until 2021. The club completed 2019–20 season at 8th place of the table.

On week 17 of the 2020–21 season, beating MKE Ankaragücü by 2–0 final score, reaching 31 points, Gaziantep FK topped the first position of Süper Lig standings, with one game in front Beşiktaş, on 5 January 2021. Following a 1–3 loss against Galatasaray at week one, the 2019–20 season, the team retained a 15-week-long unbeaten record until 9 January 2021, where they have been eventually beaten by Sivasspor by 1–2. Following a long infiltrated discussion concentrated a contract renewal between the board of club and Șumudică, the club sacked Romanian coach on 11 January 2021. The club agreed with Portuguese former international Ricardo Sá Pinto on a two-and-a-half-season-long contract, with a potential one season extension, on 20 January 2021. After 6 wins and 6 draws out of 21 official games, finishing the season on 9th place under Sá Pinto's management, the parties agreed for a mutual termination at the end of the season. Club announced their agreement with Erol Bulut on 20 May 2021.

Following the 2023 Turkey–Syria earthquake earthquake, the club withdrew from the 2022-23 Süper Lig.

Crest and colors
The first colors of the club were blue and white. The colors were altered into "white-red-black" combination and the new and current logo was enacted, all together under the scope of a council board, including changing the name of club, held in June 2017. The design of crest was inspired after baklava slices, colored in official club colors.

Stadium

Since their promotion to TFF Third League in 1993, Gaziantep FK played in professional leagues, governed by TFF. During playing at third division, the club co-tenanted their home fixtures with Gaziantepspor at Kamil Ocak Stadium between 1993 and 2000.  They played their first home game at professional leagues at Kamil Ocak Stadium, on 3 October 1993, where they beat Adana Polisgücü by 3–0, at week 2 of 1993–94 season, on 3 October 1993.

They sublet GASKİ Stadium of GASKİ SK between 2000 and 2005, until they promoted to TFF First League. Their first game at GASKİ Stadium against Bakırköyspor at first week of 2000–01 season, which they won 6–0, on 13 August 2000. The club returned to Kamil Ocak Stadium at 2005–05 season. They played their last home game at Kamil Ocak Stadium against Eskişehirspor, losing the game 0–1, on 23 December 2016. Demolition of Kamil Ocak Stadium was started in October 2018.

Constructed between 2013 and 2017 with an approximate 120m TRY, the club took New Gaziantep Stadium, their own stadium, with all-seated 35,502 of capacity, in 2017. They played their first home match of club at New Gaziantep Stadium on 28 January 2017, where team beat Bandırmaspor 3–1. Muhammet Reis scored the first ever goal of stadium's history in the 10th minute of the same match.

Honours
Sankospor
TFF Third League
Winner: 1996–97 (Group 3)

Gaziantep Büyükşehir Belediyespor
TFF Second League
Winner: 2004–05 (Group C)

Gazişehir Gaziantep F.K.
TFF First League
Play-off winners: 2018–19

Team records

League affiliation
Süper Lig: 2019–
TFF First League: 1997–2001, 2005–2019 
TFF Second League: 2001–2005 
TFF Third League: 1993–1997 
Turkish Regional Amateur League: 1988–1993

Recent seasons

Players

Current squad

Out on loan

Club Officials

Coaching history

Presidential history

References

External links

Official website
Gaziantep FK at Turkish Football Federation

Gaziantep F.K.
Sport in Gaziantep
Football clubs in Turkey
Association football clubs established in 1988
1988 establishments in Turkey
Süper Lig clubs